Jose Enrique Sandejas Garcia III (born November 12, 1971) is a Filipino politician from Bataan. He is the incumbent governor of Bataan since June 30, 2022. He served as Representative of Bataan's 2nd District from 2016 to 2022. He also served as Mayor of Balanga from 2007 to 2016.

Biography 
Garcia is the son of the former governor Enrique "Tet" Garcia and Mrs. Vicky Garcia. His older brother, Albert "Abet" S. Garcia, is a representative of the province's 2nd congressional district.

He holds a Bachelor of Arts degree (General Humanities with specialization in Political Economy) from the University of Asia and the Pacific.

Personal life

Marriage and children 
Garcia is married to Maria Isabel Fernandez, and has three sons, Diego (born 2002), Paolo (born 2005) and Nicolo (born 2009).

|-

|-

1971 births
Members of the House of Representatives of the Philippines from Bataan
PDP–Laban politicians
Mayors of places in Bataan
People from Balanga, Bataan
Living people
University of Asia and the Pacific alumni